Pamela Anne Gordon (10 February 1943 – 25 January 2023) was a Canadian model. She was Playboy magazine's first Canadian Playmate, featured in its March 1962 issue. Her centerfold was photographed by Mario Casilli and Ken Honey.

Gordon was born in British Columbia on 10 February 1943. She went on to work as a Bunny at the Chicago Playboy Club. She also was named one of the top Canadians of 1962 by Liberty magazine.

Gordon died in Abbotsford, British Columbia on 25 January 2023, at the age of 79.

See also
 List of people in Playboy 1960–1969

References

External links
 Miss March 1962: Pamela Anne Gordon at Playboy

1943 births
2023 deaths
1960s Playboy Playmates
People from British Columbia